Towles Glacier is a glacier descending from the western slopes of Mount Humphrey Lloyd to enter Tucker Glacier northwest of Trigon Bluff, in Victoria Land. Mapped by United States Geological Survey (USGS) from surveys and U.S. Navy air photos, 1960–62. Named by Advisory Committee on Antarctic Names (US-ACAN) for Lieutenant William J. Towles, U.S. Navy, medical officer at Hallett Station, 1960.

Glaciers of Victoria Land
Borchgrevink Coast